Old School is the fourteenth studio album by Canadian rock band Helix, released in June 2019.

Track listing

Notes
 "Games Mother Never Taught You", "Tie Me Down", and "Your Turn to Cry" were recorded in 1989 as demos for "Back for Another Taste", however they were not included on the album. All three songs feature former Lead Guitarist, Paul Hackman on guitar and backing vocals.
 All songs were written from 1981 to 1989 and include compositions by Paul Hackman.
 The song "Cheers" was extracted from an old beat-up master tape.

Personnel
Helix
 Brian Vollmer - lead vocals
 Chris Julke - guitar, backing vocals
 Kaleb "Duckman" Duck - guitar, backing vocals
 Daryl Gray - bass, keyboards, guitar, backing vocals
 Greg "Fritz" Hinz - drums, backing vocals

Additional Musicians
 Paul Hackman - guitar, backing vocals
 Sam Reid - piano

Production
Producer: Daryl Gray
Art direction: Scott Waters, Brent "The Doctor" Doerner

References

External links

Helix (band) albums
2019 albums